This page lists the songs that reached number-one on the overall Hot R&B/Hip-Hop Songs chart, the R&B Songs chart, and the Hot Rap Songs chart in 2023. The R&B Songs and Rap Songs charts partly serve as distillations of the overall R&B/Hip-Hop Songs chart.

Chart history

See also
2023 in American music
2023 in hip hop music
List of Billboard Hot 100 number-one singles of 2023
List of Billboard number-one R&B/hip-hop albums of 2023

References

2023
United States RandB
Number-one RandB songs